Happiness, Like Water is a 2013 collection of short stories written by Nigeria writer Chinelo Okparanta. It was first published on August 13, 2013, by Mariner Books, an imprint of HarperCollins publishers.

Plot summary
The anthology has a total collection of seven stories; each having a different but unique message to deliver. These messages include the life of Nigerians towards the "Yahoo Boys", the life of homosexuals in Nigeria and the image of Nigeria in the diaspora.

List of Stories
On Ohaeto Street
Wahala
Fairness
Runs Girl
America
Shelter
Tumours and Butterflies

References 

2013 short story collections
Nigerian short story collections
Women's fiction
Lesbian fiction
Mariner Books books